Alejandro Diaz Quezada (previously known as Alejandro Quezada; born July 9, 1975) is a former professional baseball player.  He is the first person to transfer from Nippon Professional Baseball to Major League Baseball through the posting system.

Diaz played for the Hiroshima Toyo Carp in 1998.  Prior to the 1999 season, Diaz was posted by Hiroshima to the Cincinnati Reds.  He signed a minor league contract with Cincinnati.  Diaz played in the Reds' minor league system through 2003, without reaching the major leagues.

References

External links

1975 births
Living people
Hiroshima Toyo Carp players
Baseball players at the 2007 Pan American Games
Clinton LumberKings players
Chattanooga Lookouts players
Sportspeople from San Pedro de Macorís
Dominican Republic baseball players
Dominican Republic expatriate baseball players in Japan
Nippon Professional Baseball outfielders
Pan American Games competitors for the Dominican Republic